Alan Ronaldson (12 September 1896 – 9 January 1965) was a New Zealand cricketer. He played in one first-class match for Wellington in 1922/23.

See also
 List of Wellington representative cricketers

References

External links
 

1896 births
1965 deaths
New Zealand cricketers
Wellington cricketers
Cricketers from Wellington City